Jamie Ross Bruce (born 29 August 1976) is a Scottish former footballer. Bruce began his career with Hamilton Academical as a schoolboy. In 1996 he signed for Dumbarton, where he made his first team debut as a 20-year-old. He was to play for six seasons and had over 100 first-team appearances before retiring from senior football the age of 25, due to continual injury. He returned to play at the junior level for a few seasons with Johnstone Burgh and Larkhall Thistle.

References

1976 births
Scottish footballers
Dumbarton F.C. players
Scottish Football League players
Living people
Association football defenders
Johnstone Burgh F.C. players
Larkhall Thistle F.C. players
East Kilbride Thistle F.C. players